Nothris lemniscellus is a moth of the family Gelechiidae. It was described by Philipp Christoph Zeller in 1839. It is found from Fennoscandia to the Pyrenees, Italy and Albania, and from France to Ukraine.

The wingspan is 18–22 mm. Adults have been recorded on wing from mid-July to August.

The larvae feed on Globularia cordifolia and Globularia punctata. They mine the leaves of their host plant. The mine has the form of a corridor, forming a loose spiral. The mine is full depth. The frass is deposited in a broad central line. The final part of the mine has the form of a blotch. Older larvae live freely amongst spun leaves. Larvae have been recorded in May, but also in November.

References

 "Nothris lemniscellus (Zeller, 1839)". Insecta.pro. Retrieved February 5, 2020.

Moths described in 1839
Chelariini
Moths of Europe